In enzymology, a nicotinate glucosyltransferase is an enzyme that catalyzes the chemical reaction

UDP-glucose + nicotinate  UDP + N-glucosylnicotinate

Thus, the two substrates of this enzyme are UDP-glucose and nicotinate, whereas its two products are UDP and N-glucosylnicotinate.

This enzyme belongs to the family of glycosyltransferases, specifically the hexosyltransferases.  The systematic name of this enzyme class is UDP-glucose:nicotinate N-glucosyltransferase. Other names in common use include uridine diphosphoglucose-nicotinate N-glucosyltransferase, and UDP-glucose:nicotinic acid-N-glucosyltransferase.

References

 

EC 2.4.1
Enzymes of unknown structure